Count Ladislas de Hoyos (Ladislaus Alfons Konstantin Heinrich Johannes de Hoyos) born into the Austro-Hungarian Counts de Hoyos family (27 March 1939 – 8 December 2011) was a French TV journalist and politician. He was news broadcaster for TF1's and is known to have been the first journalist to interview in 1972 the former Gestapo member Klaus Barbie who lived in Bolivia. Barbie lived under the alias of Klaus Altmann and De Hoyos managed with Beate Klarsfeld to discover where the war criminal was hidden. De Hoyos covered in 1987 the trial of Barbie in Lyon and wrote a book about him.

He was elected as mayor of Seignosse in 2001 and was reelected in 2008. Ladislas de Hoyos died in office as mayor of Seignosse.

In 1991, Ladislas de Hoyos left the 8 PM news program of TF1. He was replaced by the French journalist Claire Chazal. In 1997, he worked at Radio France Inter to produce the history magazine The Days of the Century.
In 2001 he was elected mayor of Seignosse, Landes, position he held until his death. 
In July 2006, he was appointed Chevalier of the Légion d'honneur.

In 1975, he married Corinne Meilhan-Bordes, air hostess at Air France with whom he had two daughters, Amelie and Charlotte. In 1991 he met Magali Fernández-Salazar, young Neuroscientist, Philosopher and former Journalist at Radio France Internationale, with whom he began a relationship that lasted until the end of his life.

He died on 8 December 2011 in Seignosse, where he is buried.

References 

1939 births
2011 deaths
French television presenters
French journalists
Journalists from Brussels
Politicians from Brussels